Cyperus eremicus is a species of sedge that is native to parts of the Middle East.

See also 
 List of Cyperus species

References 

eremicus
Plants described in 1995
Flora of Afghanistan
Flora of Iran
Flora of Saudi Arabia